Denilson Martinho Gabionetta, sometimes known as just Denilson (born 5 October 1985) is a Brazilian footballer who plays as a left winger for Serie D club Santa Maria.

Club
Denilson Gabionetta started his career at Hortolândia for Social Esportiva Vitória (SEV in short). He scored 5 goals in São Paulo State Football League Série A3 (the third division of the state pyramid). He was loaned to various Italian club namely Varese, Pisa, AlbinoLeffe, and Crotone.

Crotone
Denilson Gabionetta arrived Crotone in summer 2009. He scored his first goal for the Crotone on 26 September 2009, in 1 to 1 in Bergamo against Albinoleffe, his former team. He briefly returned to Brazil in the first half of 2010–11 season. In January 2011 he was loaned to Torino F.C. Italian Football Federation authorized the transfer on 23 February 2011.

In July 2011 Crotone signed Denilson Gabionetta from SEV again in a temporary deal with an option to buy. In summer 2012 Crotone excised the option in a 2-year contract.

Parma
In 2013 Denilson Gabionetta was signed by Parma F.C. for €200,000 in a co-ownership deal. In June 2014 the co-ownership deal was renewed. However, in summer 2014 Parma bought him outright for another €200,000.

Salernitana
Salernitana signed Denilson Gabionetta on loan with an option to buy outright on 18 July 2014, from Parma.

Parma went bankrupted in June 2015, making Denílson a free agent. He also signed a new contract with Salernitana.

Hangzhou Greentown
On 26 February 2016 Denilson Gabionetta was sold to Chinese football club Hangzhou Greentown.

Later years
On 16 October 2020, after a season at Serie C's Padova, Denílson joined Olhanense in Portugal.

In October 2021, he moved back to Italy to sign for Serie D club FC Messina. Less than two months later, he however left FC Messina to join fellow Serie D club Santa Maria.

References

External links
 U.C. AlbinoLeffe Official Player Profile
 
 Denílson Gabionetta at ZeroZero

1985 births
Living people
Sportspeople from Campinas
Brazilian footballers
Brazilian expatriate footballers
Serie B players
Serie C players
Liga I players
Chinese Super League players
China League One players
Cypriot First Division players
Campeonato Brasileiro Série D players
S.S.D. Varese Calcio players
Pisa S.C. players
U.C. AlbinoLeffe players
F.C. Crotone players
Torino F.C. players
CFR Cluj players
U.S. Salernitana 1919 players
Zhejiang Professional F.C. players
AEL Limassol players
Associação Atlética Caldense players
Calcio Padova players
Expatriate footballers in Italy
Brazilian expatriate sportspeople in Italy
Expatriate footballers in Romania
Brazilian expatriate sportspeople in Romania
Expatriate footballers in China
Brazilian expatriate sportspeople in China
Expatriate footballers in Cyprus
Brazilian expatriate sportspeople in Cyprus
Association football midfielders